Nicolás Gabriel Sánchez (born 4 February 1986) is an Argentine former professional footballer who played as a centre back.

Career
Born in the Mataderos neighborhood of Buenos Aires, Sánchez began playing football as a midfielder in Boca Juniors' youth system. He became a professional with Nueva Chicago, with whom he made his debut in the 2003–04 Argentine Primera División, on 26 June 2004 against Independente. Nueva Chicago was relegated soon after, and Sánchez continued to be part of the club's first team during the next two seasons in the Primera B Nacional. In early 2006, Nueva Chicago's manager Rodolfo Motta converted Sánchez to a centre back following an injury to the club's regular defender, and within six months the club was promoted to the Primera División for the 2006–07 season.

After Nueva Chicago was relegated again at the end of the 2006–07 season, Sánchez joined rivals River Plate for the 2007–08 season. River Plate would win the Clausura 2008 during his tenure with the club. However, Sánchez struggled with injuries, missing almost a year with a broken bone in his foot, and in 2010, after River Plate re-appointed manager, Ángel Cappa, and Sánchez left the club for Godoy Cruz on a free transfer.

Sánchez spent the next four seasons with Godoy Cruz. The club achieved mid-table finishes, and Sánchez participated in the Copa Libertadores twice.

Racing Club's manager Diego Cocca signed Sánchez on 1 July 2014. Racing had narrowly avoided relegation in the prior season, and Sánchez would become a key part of Racing's defense as the club bounced back to win the Primera División title.

Honours

River Plate
Argentine Primera División: 2008 Clausura

Racing Club
Argentine Primera División: 2014 Primera

Monterrey
Liga MX: Apertura 2019
Copa MX: Apertura 2017, 2019–20
CONCACAF Champions League: 2019, 2021 

Individual
Liga MX Best XI: Apertura 2017, Apertura 2019
CONCACAF Champions League Golden Ball: 2019
CONCACAF Champions League Team of the Tournament: 2019

References

External links 
 Argentine Primera statistics at Fútbol XXI 

Footballers from Buenos Aires
1986 births
Living people
Argentine footballers
Argentine expatriate footballers
Association football midfielders
Nueva Chicago footballers
Club Atlético River Plate footballers
Godoy Cruz Antonio Tomba footballers
Racing Club de Avellaneda footballers
C.F. Monterrey players
Argentine Primera División players
Primera Nacional players
Liga MX players
Expatriate footballers in Mexico